Mouhamed Ablaye Gaye (born 11 January 1983), commonly known as Aflaye or Abo Bobo, is a Senegalese footballer who plays for Al-Suwaiq Club in Oman Professional League.

Club career

Africain
Mouhamed began his professional career in 2000 with Club Africain of Tunisia. In the five years he spent at the Tunis-based club he helped his team to reach the finals of the Tunisian Cup in 2003.

Marsa
After spending a long five-years spell at the Tunis-based club he moved to La Marsa, a coastal town near Tunis where he signed a one-year contract with AS Marsa. He again helped his Tunisian club to reach the finals of the Tunisian Cup in 2006.

Al-Urooba
In 2006, he moved to the United Arab Emirates and signed a one-year contract with Al-Urooba Club of UAE First Division.

Zarzis
In 2007, he came back to Tunisia and signed a one-year contract with ES Zarzis.

Al-Hamriyah
In 2008, he came back to the United Arab Emirates and signed a one-year contract with another UAE First Division club, Al-Hamriyah.

Masfoot
After a short one-year spell with Al-Hamriyah, he signed a one-year contract with another UAE First Division club, Masfoot.

Al-Suwaiq
In 2011, he moved to Oman and signed a one-year contract with Al-Suwaiq Club. He scored 4 goals in 2011–12 Oman Elite League. He made his AFC Cup debut on 6 March 2012 in a 2-0 loss against Kuwaiti side Al-Qadsia and scored his first goal in the competition 11 April 2012 in a 2-0 win over Syrian side, Al-Ittihad SC Aleppo. He scored 2 goals in 6 appearances in the 2012 AFC Cup for the Al-Suwaiq-based club.

Dhofar
At the end of the 2011–12 season, he moved to Salalah and signed a six-months contract with Dhofar S.C.S.C. He scored 3 goals in the 2012–13 Oman Elite League.

Al-Nahda

In January 2013, he signed a six-month contract with Al-Nahda Club. He scored 4 goals for the club in the 2012–13 Oman Elite League and 3 goals in the 2012 Sultan Qaboos Cup. At the end of the 2012-13 season, he signed a one-year contract extension with the Al-Buraimi-based club. He scored 13 goals in 22 appearances in the 2013–14 Oman Professional League, 2 goals in 5 appearances in the 2013 Sultan Qaboos Cup. He also made his debut in the GCC Champions League on 3 March 2014 in a 1-1 draw against Kuwaiti side, Al-Nasr SC and scored his first goal in the competition on 12 March 2014 in a 2-0 win over Qatari side, Al-Kharaitiyat SC. He scored 1 goal in 6 appearances in the 2014 GCC Champions League. He finished as the second top-scorer of the 2013-14 Oman Professional League, with his team mate, Juma Saeed along with Al-Suwaiq Club's Mohammed Al-Ghassani leading the top scorer chart with 16 goals each. He helped his club to win the 2013-14 Oman Professional League, achieve the runners-up place in the 2013 Sultan Qaboos Cup and reach the semi-finals of the 2014 GCC Champions League.

Al-Nasr

Al-Nasr S.C.S.C.

On 11 June 2014, he moved back to Salalah and signed a one-year contract with rivals of his former club Dhofar S.C.S.C., Al-Nasr S.C.S.C. He made his debut for the Salalah-based club on 11 September 2014 in a 1-1 draw against Sohar SC. His highlight of the 2014–15 Oman Professional League season was a brace in a 3-0 victory over fierce rivals and his former club, Dhofar S.C.S.C. in a match that is also famous as the Oman Derby. Both the goals came from free-kicks in the 2nd half as the Senegalese swirled the ball past Dhofar's goalkeeper and Omani international, Hani Al-Sabti.

Back to Al-Suwaiq

On 26 July 2015, he signed a one-year contract with his first and foremost club in Oman, Al-Suwaiq Club and thus he was unveiled as the first professional signing of the club for the 2015–16 Oman Professional League. He made his first appearance and scored his first goal in the 2015-16 Oman Professional League on 13 September 2015 in a 2-1 win over his former club, Al-Nasr S.C.S.C. as he converted the spot kick into a goal against Al-Nasr's Omani international goalkeeper, Faiz Al-Rushaidi.

Club career statistics

Honours

Club
With Club Africain
Tunisian Cup (0): Runner-up 2003, 2006
With Al-Suwaiq
Oman Super Cup (0): Runner-up 2011
With Al-Nahda
Oman Professional League (1): 2013-14
Sultan Qaboos Cup (0): Runner-up 2012-13, 2013-14

References

External links
Mouhamed Ablaye Gaye at Goal.com

Mouhamed Ablaye Gaye - KOOORA
Mouhamed Ablaye Gaye - YouTube
Mouhamed Ablaye Gaye - YouTube
Mouhamed Ablaye Gaye - YouTube
Mouhamed Ablaye Gaye - YouTube

1983 births
Living people
People from Dakar
Senegalese Muslims
Senegalese footballers
Senegalese expatriate footballers
Association football midfielders
AS Marsa players
ES Zarzis players
Suwaiq Club players
Dhofar Club players
Al-Nahda Club (Oman) players
Al-Nasr SC (Salalah) players
Al Urooba Club players
Masfout Club players
Al Hamriyah Club players
UAE First Division League players
Expatriate footballers in Tunisia
Senegalese expatriate sportspeople in Tunisia
Expatriate footballers in the United Arab Emirates
Senegalese expatriate sportspeople in the United Arab Emirates
Expatriate footballers in Oman
Senegalese expatriate sportspeople in Oman